Kanwal Ameen is a Pakistani professor in information management. She has served as chairperson (2009-2018) of the Department of Information Management (University of the Punjab), formerly the Department of Library and Information Science, and as director, directorate of external linkages. On 31 May 2019, Ameen was appointed to a four-year term as vice-chancellor of the University of Home Economics.

Ameen is the chief editor for the Pakistan Journal of Information Management and Libraries.  She is also a teacher, author, researcher, and lecturer in the field of library and information science as well as a pre-doc (2000–2001) and post-doc (2009–2010) international Fulbright Scholar.

Education
Ameen attended the University of the Punjab, and in 1985, after receiving a diploma in library science, began working as a librarian in the Department of Philosophy.  In 1986, she earned a Master's degree in library science.  In 1993, she traveled to the Netherlands and attended a 3-month diploma course on library management at Hague University, then worked as a lecturer at University of the Punjab from 1993 to 2004. She furthered her education, and attended the University of Texas at Austin in 2000 as a Fulbright pre-doctoral scholar, and four years later was working as an assistant professor at the University of the Punjab.  In 2005, she was awarded a PhD in library and information science from the University of the Punjab.  Her thesis was titled, Philosophy and Framework of Collection Management and Its Application in University Libraries in Pakistan: An Appraisal.

Career

Teaching
Ameen's teaching interests are in the areas of personality development, information services, information behaviour, qualitative research, information literacy, personal information management, and marketing of information services.  She worked in a supervisory capacity at the doctoral level, and became a professor at University of the Punjab in 2008.  She attended the University of Missouri in 2010 as a postdoc Fulbright Visiting Scholar and researcher. Ameen became chairperson of the then Department of Library and Information Science which was renamed Department of Information Management. She entered the tenure track in 2013. That same year, she completed a research fellowship at the University of Tsukuba in Japan.

In 2015, Ameen chaired the Centennial International Conference on Information Management and Libraries in Lahore, noting the progress of her Department from its earliest beginnings as a certificate course that had grown into a full PhD program over the course of a century.  It was in 1915 that Asa Don Dickinson, an American author and the first Chief Librarian for Brooklyn College, took a year-long sabbatical and traveled to India to teach at University of the Punjab (Lahore). He lectured on what was considered modern library methods at that time. In 1916, he wrote the book Panjab Library Primer for the students he taught at Punjab University, and is credited for establishing what became known as the Department of Information Management for which Ameen was first appointed chairperson in 2009. In May 2015, she was appointed for a third consecutive 3-year term as department chair that completed in May 2018.

Research
, Ameen had 200+ publications. She has served as Secretary of the IFLA Discussion on Library & Information Science Education in Developing Countries. Additionally, she is a member of the editorial advisory board of the Journal of Knowledge and Communication Management, Library Management, and editor-in-chief of the Pakistan Journal of Information Management and Libraries (formerly Pakistan Journal of Library and Information Science) from 2005 to 2009.

In a 2013 study of examining why impact scores for Pakistani authors in the LIS field were generally low, Sajjad Ullah Jan and Mumtaz A. Anwar found that Ameen had an h-index of 5, but her ranking was the third highest total published papers of the 11 published library and information science faculty in Pakistan (out of a total of 53 faculty members, most unpublished). That said, 37.7% of the citations were self-citations, more than other published Pakistani LIS authors, but even after removing self-citations, Ameen maintained third position. By 2016, Ameen's h-index had risen to 12.

Other
Ameen convened and supervised a committee to redesign Punjab University's official website. Made available in English and Urdu, the website was recognised for its accessibility by vice chancellor Mujahid Kamran, during a launching ceremony held in February 2016.

Personal life
Ameen is the mother of Ali Zafar, a Pakistani actor and singer. In a 2010 interview with Abdul Samad Ansari, Ameen explained that she entered into an arranged marriage with her husband, Mohammad Zafarullah.

Honours and awards
In 2010, Ameen received the Pakistan Library Association (PLA) Appreciation Award for Academic Achievement.  That same year, she also received a Best University Teacher Award from the Higher Education Commission of Pakistan but the award carried added significance for Ameen as she was "the first-ever library information science professor to earn the honour."  In 2013, Ameen received the Asian Library Leader's Award for Professional Excellence from the Satija Research Foundation for Library and Information Science, India.

Selected works
Ameen has published in many forms, including books, journals, and conference papers.  Following are a few of her published works:
 
Ameen, Kanwal. (2020). "Graduate researchers' perceptions and expectations: An exploratory study about reference and information services." Reference Services Review, 48(2), 227-242. http://dx.doi.org/10.1108/RSR-02-2019-0009

References

External links

Pakistan Journal of Information Management and Libraries

Year of birth missing (living people)
Living people
People from Lahore
University of the Punjab alumni
University of Texas at Austin School of Information alumni
Academic staff of the University of the Punjab
Pakistani librarians
Vice-Chancellors of the University of Home Economics
The Hague University of Applied Sciences alumni